Night Child may refer to:
 Night Child (album), a 1979 album by Oscar Peterson
 The Cursed Medallion, a 1975 Italian horror film, also released as The Night Child
 Night Child (1956 film), a Swedish crime drama film

See also
 Nightchild, a novel in the Chronicles of the Raven trilogy